Martin Michael Johnson (March 18, 1899 – January 29, 1975) was the Bishop of Nelson, British Columbia, Canada for 18 years. He then became Archbishop of the Archdiocese of Vancouver, British Columbia, Canada from 1964 to 1969.

Curriculum Vitae
Martin Johnson was born on March 18, 1899, in Toronto, Ontario, Canada.

Ordination
In 1924, Martin Johnson became a priest, in the Diocese of Nelson, British Columbia, Canada.

Consecration
In 1936, Martin Johnson became consecrated as bishop and became Bishop of Nelson. In 1954 he became Coadjutor Archbishop of Vancouver and then was appointed as Archbishop of Vancouver in 1964 and retired in 1969.

Martin Johnson died on January 29, 1975, as Archbishop Emeritus of Vancouver.

Legacy
 He helped the Christian Brothers of Ireland, establish the high school of St. Thomas More Collegiate, which provided Catholic education in the cities of Burnaby & New Westminster.

Service to God
 Priest for 51 years
 Bishop for 38 years

Notes
Johnson is noted for being a great organizer & fundraiser. He centralized Catholic services and restructured Catholic education.

He was also the first Bishop of the new Diocese of Nelson, British Columbia.

References

External links
 Archdiocese of Vancouver former bishops
 Catholic Hierarchey

1899 births
1975 deaths
20th-century Roman Catholic archbishops in Canada
Roman Catholic archbishops of Vancouver
Participants in the Second Vatican Council
Clergy from Toronto
Roman Catholic bishops of Nelson